Hartwell Lakeside Park, formerly known as Hart State Park, is a  park located at 330 of Hart Park Road, in Hartwell, Georgia, in northeast Georgia. The park is named after the American Revolutionary War heroine Nancy Hart, who lived in the Georgia frontier, and it was her devotion to freedom that has helped make her name commonplace in the Georgia upcountry today.

This recreation area is used by the community for swimming, boating, water skiing and water sports in general, and fishing on Lake Hartwell, and for hiking and biking on a  trail.  Hart Park also offers a playground for children and a self-registration campground, which is opened seasonally from March 15 until September 15.

History
In April 2020, management of the park passed from the Georgia Department of Natural Resources to the City of Hartwell. In June 2020, a groundbreaking ceremony was officially held for the renamed Hartwell Lakeside Park.

Facilities
 78 tent, trailer, RV campsites  
 16 walk-in campsites  
 5 cottages (closed)
 swimming beaches (seasonal) 
 3 picnic shelters
 cricket theater - music programs

References

External links

Protected areas of Hart County, Georgia
Reservoirs in Georgia (U.S. state)
State parks of Georgia (U.S. state)
Landforms of Hart County, Georgia
Hartwell, Georgia